Ken Gourlay (27 June 1914 – 28 January 1999) was an Australian cricketer. He played three first-class matches for Tasmania between 1932 and 1937.

See also
 List of Tasmanian representative cricketers

References

External links
 

1914 births
1999 deaths
Australian cricketers
Tasmania cricketers
Cricketers from Hobart